Kenneth Conrad Jackson (born August 16, 1964, in Kitwe) is a former first class cricketer. Jackson was born in Zambia but played the majority of his cricket in South Africa with Boland, having previously played for Western Province with whom he spent his first three seasons. He is the half brother of Jonathan Trott.

In 1999, Jackson played one day cricket for the Netherlands. In February 2020, he was named in South Africa's squad for the Over-50s Cricket World Cup in South Africa. However, the tournament was cancelled during the third round of matches due to the coronavirus pandemic.

References

External links
Cricinfo Profile

1964 births
Living people
People from Kitwe
South African cricketers
Western Province cricketers
Boland cricketers
Netherlands cricketers
Alumni of Rondebosch Boys' High School
South African people of English descent
White South African people
White Zambian people
Zambian people of English descent
Zambian emigrants to South Africa
South African expatriates in the Netherlands
Zambian cricketers